Stjepan Čordaš (born 18 November 1951) is a Croatian footballer and later football manager.

Playing career
Čordaš is the record holder for the number of competitive years he spent with Osijek, playing 13 seasons with the club and captaining them to the Yugoslav First League in 1977.

Managerial career
In 2007, he took charge of Sesvete, replacing Boro Perković. In October 2015 he became boss at Segesta.

Čordaš was named manager of NK Vrapče in September 2016, succeeding Krešimir Sunar in the job.

Personal life
He is the father of Darko Čordaš.

References

External links
 

1951 births
Living people
Yugoslav footballers
NK Osijek players
Yugoslav First League players
Croatian football managers
NK Osijek managers
Chongqing Liangjiang Athletic F.C. managers
NK Kamen Ingrad managers
NK Hrvatski Dragovoljac managers
NK Sesvete managers
NK Međimurje managers
HNK Segesta managers
Croatian Football League managers
Croatian expatriate football managers
Expatriate football managers in China
Croatian expatriate sportspeople in China